The Rasina Corps was a corps of the Yugoslav Army in the Homeland (JVuO) that operated in the region of Kruševac county of Axis occupied Kingdom of Yugoslavia (modern-day Serbia) under command of Dragutin Keserović.

History 
On 11 May 1944 the Rasina Corps was merged with Toplica Corps to establish Rasina-Toplica Corps Group, an elite Chetnik unit that would receive the biggest burden of defence from Tito's communist forces and together with the Red Army liberated Kruševac from Axis occupation.

Rasina Corps evolved from Rasina Detachment. According to postwar Communist sources Rasina Corps had 3,000 soldiers. Its zone of activity was territory of former Kruševac county. It had five brigades:

 1st Trstenik Brigade
 2nd Trstenik Brigade
 Studenica Brigade
 Kruševac Brigade
 Župa Brigade

Initially, the headquarters was in Kupci village  between Kruševac and Brus, and later in Kriva Reka village on Kopaonik. The Rasina Corps had a military court and published journals including Freedom or Death and Youth.

A British mission was attached to HQ of the Rasina Corps. One of its members was Captain Robert Wade. Wade emphasized in his later testimonies that the Chetniks he contacted were convinced that the British would help them to win the war and had no indication that the British support to Chetniks would end. When Selby arrived to HQ of Keserović , he took over the command of group of British officers led by Captain Wade who were already there. Selby arrived on Kopaonik together with Yugoslav officer Petar Fereštetski, while airplane which carried them also delivered 10 machine guns and 4,000 bullets to Chetniks.

On 24 December 1943 Mihailović ordered destruction of one railway bridge on Južna Morava river in the first half of January 1944 by Rasina and Deligrad Corps.

Rasina-Toplica Corps  
Rasina-Toplica Corps Group commanded by Lt. Colonel Keserović took the biggest burden of defence from advancing Titos communist forces. This unit was established on 11 May 1944 by Chetnik Supreme Command. Together with Red Army, Rasina-Toplica Corps Group liberated Kruševac on 14 October 1944.

References

Sources

Further reading 
 

Military units and formations of the Chetniks in World War II